This is an alphabetical list of notable Nepali-language singers. These vocal artists are from the Nepal, Sikkim and Nepali-speaking regions of India, Bhutan; some belong to the immigrant population living abroad.

A
 Bhakta Raj Acharya
 Milan Amatya
 Yogeshwar Amatya

B
 Tilak Bam Malla
 Devika Bandana
 Tika Bhandari
 Nabin K Bhattarai
 Norden Tenzing Bhutia
 Om Bikram Bista
 Babu Bogati

C
 Bipul Chettri
 Rohit John Chhetri
 Nalina Chitrakar

D
 Karna Das
 Danny Denzongpa
 Koili Devi
 Tara Devi
 Ram Krishna Dhakal
 Ani Choying Dolma
 Sunita Dulal

G
 Jhalak Man Gandarbha
 Atithi Gautam K. C
 Bhumika Giri
 Narayan Gopal
 Amrit Gurung
 Ciney Gurung
 Khem Raj Gurung
 Kishor Gurung
 Mausami Gurung
 Prakash Gurung
 Sukmit Gurung

J
 Udit Narayan Jha
 Indira Joshi

K
 Bacchu Kailash
 Nati Kaji
 Mallika Karki
 Peter J. Karthak
 Ram Prasad Khanal
 Pramod Kharel
 Kamal Khatri
 Kiran Pradhan (Dr)

L
 Aruna Lama
 Raju Lama

M
 Muna Thapa Magar
 Bishnu Majhi
 Tilak Bam Malla
 Kunti Moktan
 Zascha Moktan

N
 Udit Narayan
 Natikaji

P
 Anju Panta
 Raju Pariyar
 Sugam Pokharel
 Bednidhi Poudel
 Prem Dhoj Pradhan
 Adrian Pradhan

R
 Bartika Eam Rai
 Dhiraj Rai
 Rajesh Payal Rai
 Sabin Rai
 Shambhu Rai
 Phatteman Rajbhandari
 Gyanu Rana
 Sashi Rawal
 Nima Rumba

S
 Shiva Shankar
 Deep Shrestha
 Narayan Bhakta Shrestha
 Nirnaya Shrestha
 Prakash Shrestha
 Seturam Shrestha
 Sushma Shrestha
 Manila Sotang
 Abhaya Subba
 Phiroj Shyangden

T
 Prashant Tamang
 Arun Thapa
 Dharmaraj Thapa
 Pranil L Timalsena
 Ram Man Trishit
 Ram Thapa
  Robin Tamang
 Shanti Thatal

V
Sajjan Raj Vaidya

W
 Hira Devi Waiba
 Navneet Aditya Waiba

Y
 Visan Yonjan
 Gopal Yonzon

See also
List of bands from Nepal
List of Nepalese singers

References

Lists of singers by language
Nepali-language culture
Nepali-language singers
singers